Call It What You Want may refer to:
"Call It What You Want" (New Kids on the Block song), 1991
"Call It What You Want" (Above the Law song), 1992 song
"Call It What You Want" (Foster the People song), 2011
"Call It What You Want" (Taylor Swift song), 2017
"Call It What You Want", a 1992 song by Credit to the Nation